The baptism of James VI was celebrated at Stirling Castle in December 1566 with a masque, fireworks, and a staged assault on a mock fortress.

Prince James

James was the son of Mary, Queen of Scots, and Henry Stuart, Lord Darnley. He was born on 19 July 1566 at Edinburgh Castle. The midwife was Margaret Asteane. He was taken to Stirling Castle where a nursery was prepared for him.
His cradle was made by the queen's menusier or upholsterer Nicholas Guillebault and placed under a blue plaiding canopy, rocked by a team of five aristocrats including the queen's niece, Christine Stewart. The prince's household at Stirling included Margaret Beaton, Lady Reres.

In December Lady Reres and the prince's nurse Helen Littil were dressed in black velvet gowns with black satin doublets and skirt fronts. John Balfour, one of the queen's valets, bought this cloth. It was later said that Mary dressed all her household and nobility in new clothes for baptism at her expense, exceeding their status and degree, the costumes involving cloth of gold and silver and tissue. This is in part a response to George Buchanan's claim that Mary dressed the Earl of Bothwell in magnificent clothes for the events but neglected Lord Darnley.

Preparations for the baptism and masques
While Mary was hunting with Darnley at Cramalt Tower in August 1566 she wrote invitations to the baptism. On 6 October the Privy Council allowed a tax to be raised to entertain the ambassadors at the baptism, £6000 would come from the church, £4000 from the barons and freeholders, and £2000 from burgh towns. Simon Preston of Craigmillar was receiver of the tax.

Most of the expenses of the baptism were paid from this tax of £12,000 Scots, to which Edinburgh contributed 500 merks. There are records of making the fireworks and costumes for the soldiers, but few details for the masques, costumes, and props used in the Great Hall. The decoration of the Great Hall was in part the responsibility of Mary's wardrobe servant Servais de Condé, and he recorded that the Prince's bed at the baptism had a cover of cloth of silver. Some older velvet and damask beds and bed hangings were remodelled and refurbished. Nicolas Guillebault, the menusier, upholstered chairs, folding stools, and stools of ease with velvet and Morocco leather.

The staged events at the baptism have been compared with the festival held at Bayonne by Catherine de' Medici and Charles IX of France in 1565, which may have been the model for the programme at Stirling. At Bayonne an artificial castle in the ball room was besieged to illustrate the triumph of Christianity according to a prophecy of Merlin. Arthurian themes were also explored at Stirling. At Stirling, three "counterfeit devils" with actors playing "moors" and Highland men unsuccessfully attacked a mock castle.

A part of the entertainment was written by George Buchanan, a poet in Latin who would become the young king's tutor. Bastian Pagez, a French valet, worked on the costumes and devised the choreography. The royal accounts record that Bastian was given 40 ells of "taffeteis of cord" in three colours for seven (or some) "preparatives" for the baptism. "Preparatives" here may mean "harbingers," the role of the satyrs at the feast, but may just mean the preparations in general.

Fireworks were made by soldiers of the queen's guard and the gunners of Edinburgh and Stirling castles, including Michael Gardiner. John Chisholm, comptroller clerk of the royal artillery, arranged the firework display for the baptism. The preparations were expensive, and John had to send to the Queen twice for extra money. John's account for the event lists his ingredients, including, colophony, orpiment, quicksilver, Lombard paper, camphor, gum arabic, arrows and dozens of small pottery vessels. The fireworks were made in Leith and shipped to Stirling in great secrecy, carried to the castle at the dead of night "for feir of knowledge thairof". Chisholm also arranged the making of costumes used by soldiers in the pageant of an assault on a mock castle. To perfect the costume for the teams of warriors some blue fabric had to be dyed black. Two tailors in Stirling adjusted the costumes to fit the soldiers before the performance. Four soldiers were provided with costumes and wigs made of lamb's fleece to act as "Moors", to masquerade as African people. The carpenter James Reid built the mock fort beside the churchyard of the Holy Rude Kirk, in the area known as the valley, from fir spars and boards shipped from Leith.

The French ambassador, Jean, Count de Brienne, arrived in Edinburgh on 2 November 1566 and was lodged in Henry Kinloch's house in the Canongate near Holyrood Palace. He visited Craigmillar Castle to meet Mary on 20 November. Mary had been ill, and was convalescing at Craigmillar, and courtiers including John Bellenden heard that the baptism would go ahead on 10 December. The baptism was delayed by a week. Brienne went to Stirling on 12 December, escorted by George Seton, 7th Lord Seton. James Melville of Halhill claimed that he was a "simple man" and "no courtier", suggesting by this that Mary's diplomatic policy was towards England.

The baptism
The baptism ceremony was held at Stirling on 17 December. The name and titles proclaimed were, "Charles James, James Charles, Prince and Steward of Scotland, Duke of Rothesay, Earl of Carrick, Lord of the Isles, and Baron of Renfrew".

There was a torchlit banquet, described in the chronicle called the Diurnal of Occurrents, followed by "dancing and playing in abundance". The final act of the day was a masque involving men on hobby horses singing in Italian.

Darnley and Bothwell

James's father, Lord Darnley, was estranged from the Queen. Mary and Bothwell were said to had him moved from William Bell's house in Stirling to an obscure lodging in the castle on 5 December. He stayed privately in the castle and did not attend the events, and the French diplomat Monsieur du Croc (who represented the Duke of Savoy for the occasion) was instructed not to speak to him by Charles IX. On the day of the baptism du Croc sent a message to Darnley that if he came to his room, he would exit by the other door.

According to the accusations against Mary known as the "Book of Articles" or "Hay's Articles", she had ordered a passage to be built between her chamber in the "new work" or palace to the Great Hall where Bothwell lodged. Her building work was unfinished. This "passage" was later replaced by the neo-gothic bridge between the palace and great hall.

Fireworks and a mock castle
A wild bull was hunted in the Park of the castle on 18 December. On 19 December there were fireworks directed by John Chisholm and the gunners Charles Bordeaux and James Hector. The pageant consisted of an assault on a mock castle by wildmen. The 28 Highland wildmen dressed in goats-skin carrying fireworks were fought by fifteen soldiers dressed as landsknechts, moors, and devils, armed with two cannons.

Dancers with tails at the feast

On 19 December 1566 there was a feast and entertainment in the Great Hall of the castle. The food was brought from the kitchens by a procession led by musicians followed by the three Masters of the Household, the Laird of Findlater, Francisco de Busso, and Gilbert Balfour.

James Melville of Halhill wrote that Bastian Pagez was responsible for an entertainment in the Great Hall of Stirling Castle on 19 December which offended the English guests at the baptism. Mary and thirty guests sat at a round table like King Arthur's at the head of the hall. The courses of the dinner were brought up the hall on a moving table, with twelve men dressed as satyrs, with long tails, carrying lighted torches. In their other hand the satyrs carried whips to clear the way in front. When the table reached the stage, the satyrs passed their torches to bystanders. Then six servers dressed as nymphs who had been seated on the moving table, passed the food to the satyrs, who brought the dishes up to the round table on the stage.

Meanwhile, courtiers costumed as nymphs and satyrs sang Latin verses specially written by George Buchanan in honour of the food and hosts as the "gift of the offering of rustic gods to James and his mother". The Latin title is Pompae Deorum Rusticorum. The parts of the song were alternately given to the satyrs, nereids, fauns, and naiads who addressed the Queen and Prince, and it was concluded by characters representing the Orkney Islands.<ref>published title, Pompae Deorum Rusticorum dona serentium Jacobo VI & Mariae matri eius, Scotorum Regibus in coena que Regis baptisma est consecuta, in George Buchanan, Omnia Opera,, vol. 2 (Leiden, 1725), pp. 404-5 part translated in [https://books.google.com/books?id=NTw-AAAAcAAJ Thomas Innes, A Critical Essay on the Ancient Inhabitants of Scotland, vol. 1 (1729), 349-352]</ref> The nereids had used compasses to navigate their way to Scotland following the Great Bear from the New World. They represented Indigenous peoples of the Americas.

When the satyrs first wagged their tails, the English guests took it as reference to an old saying that Englishmen had tails. This story of English tails was first set down in the Middle Ages by the chronicle writers William of Malmesbury, Wace, and Layamon in his Brut. The origin was a legend that Saint Austin cursed the Kentish men of Rochester to have rayfish tails, and afterwards they were called muggles. Polydore Vergil had more recently published a version of the legend, writing that the curse applied to the descendants of people from Strood who had cut off the tail of Thomas Becket's horse. From this ancient story it had become proverbial in Europe that all Englishmen had secret tails.

Melville criticised the diplomatic skills of the guests for taking offence at this, saying they should have pretended not to see the joke. Some of the English guests, including Christopher Hatton, sat down behind the high table to face away from the spectacle, and the Queen and the English ambassador, the Earl of Bedford had to smooth things over. Melville said that Hatton told him he would have stabbed Bastian for the offence, done because Mary, for once, showed more favour to Englishmen rather than the French.

The moving table or stage was drawn up the hall four times for four courses, led by the satyrs. Each time its decorative theme was renewed. During the fourth course a child actor descended from the roof in a globe. The stage mechanism broke during the fifth course.

Diplomats and gifts
Francis Russell, 2nd Earl of Bedford, represented Queen Elizabeth at the baptism and was guest of honour at the banquet and masque. She gave him a gold chain set with pearls, diamonds, and rubies. Bedford refused to go in the chapel at the baptism, and Jean Stewart, Countess of Argyll went in his place, and he gave her a ring with ruby, according to Queen Elizabeth's instructions. Bedford brought a gold font "curiously wrought and enamelled" by the goldsmiths Brandon and Partridge, and there were plans to hijack his convoy near Doncaster and steal it.

According to James Melville of Halhill, Mary gave Christopher Hatton a chain of pearls and a diamond ring, a ring and a chain with her miniature picture to George Carey, and gold chains to Mr Lignish (Ralph Liggens or Lygon), a friend of the Duke of Norfolk, and to five English gentlemen of "quality". She received a necklace of pearl and rubies and earrings from the French ambassador, the Count de Brienne, otherwise described as a "carcanet of fine work". In January 1567 Obertino Solaro, Sieur de Moretta, the ambassador of the Duke of Savoy, who was late for the baptism, gave Mary a fan with jewelled feathers.

After the baptism, James Stewart, 1st Earl of Moray, took the Earl of Bedford on a tour of Fife. They visited St Andrews and Hallyards, a house of William Kirkcaldy of Grange Mary went to Drummond Castle and to Tullibardine Castle for New Year, the home of William Murray, without Lord Darnley who went to Glasgow.David Hay Fleming, Mary Queen of Scots (London, 1897), p. 430 fn. 113 citing Hay's "Book of Articles".

The wardrobe servant Servais de Condé recorded that a piece of large leaf verdure tapestry, originally from Huntly Castle, and a small Turkish carpet were lost from Stirling Castle, and a tapestry from the suite of "Rabbit Hunt" from Linlithgow Palace, at the time of the baptism.

In 1568 Ralph Lignish or Liggons was involved in the Duke of Norfolk's discussions at Hampton Court with Moray and John Lesley about him marrying Mary, Queen of Scots, which led to his execution. He may have been the Duke's messenger at the Stirling baptism, said to have told Mary that in the event of Elizabeth having no heir, "he and diverse others of the principalest of the nobility were to stand for her and hers". According to Robert Melville, Norfolk sent him to Mary in captivity at Lochleven Castle, to advise her not to abdicate in favour of her son. He went into exile in France. Mary wrote to Liggons from Chartley, twenty years later.

More masques at the Stuart court
In January 1581 James Stewart, the son of James Stewart, 1st Lord Doune, married Elizabeth Stewart, the elder daughter of Regent Moray. The wedding was celebrated on 31 January in Fife with a tournament of "running at the ring" and James VI took part. Two day after the party came to Leith, where a water pageant culminated with a theatrical assault on a Papal Castel Sant'Angelo, built on boats on the water of Leith.

The eldest son of James VI and Anne of Denmark, Prince Henry, was baptised at Stirling in 1594. The celebrations involved a tournament of running at the ring in fancy dress, desserts and fruits served by six ladies from a moving stage drawn by a "Moor", and a model ship loaded with fish made from sugar.

References

Further reading
 Bath, Michael, 'Anglici caudati: courtly celebration and national insult in the Stirling 1566 royal baptism,' in Alison Adams and Philip Ford, ed., Le livre demeure: Studies in Book History in Honour of Alison Saunders, Librairie Droz, Geneva (2011), pp. 183–94.
 Carpenter, Sarah, 'Performing Diplomacies: the 1560s Court Entertainments of Mary Queen of Scots,' in Scottish Historical Review, vol. 82, 2, no. 214 (October 2003), pp. 194-225
 Lynch, Michael, 'Queen Mary's Triumph: the Baptismal Celebrations at Stirling in 1566,' in Scottish Historical Review'', vol. 69 part 1, no. 187 (April 1990), pp. 1–21.
 Portrait of John Astley, Master of Queen Elizabeth's jewel office, who provided the font, National Trust

1566 plays
1566 in Scotland
Masques
Scottish plays
European court festivities
Court of Mary, Queen of Scots
Renaissance in Scotland
Drama at the Scottish royal court